Berta Castells Franco (born 24 January 1984 in Torredembarra, Catalonia) is a female hammer thrower from Spain. Her personal best throw is 70.52 metres, achieved in  2016 in Manresa (Spain).

Achievements

References

1984 births
Living people
Spanish female hammer throwers
Athletes from Catalonia
Athletes (track and field) at the 2004 Summer Olympics
Athletes (track and field) at the 2008 Summer Olympics
Athletes (track and field) at the 2012 Summer Olympics
Olympic athletes of Spain
People from Tarragonès
Sportspeople from the Province of Tarragona
Mediterranean Games silver medalists for Spain
Athletes (track and field) at the 2013 Mediterranean Games
Mediterranean Games medalists in athletics
Spanish Athletics Championships winners
Athletes (track and field) at the 2018 Mediterranean Games
20th-century Spanish women
21st-century Spanish women